Atem Kuol Atem Bol (born 24 December 1991) is a South Sudanese basketball player for the Northside Wizards of the NBL1 North.

Early life
Atem was born in Bor, South Sudan. He and his family spent four years in the Kakuma refugee camp in Kenya before moving to Sydney, Australia, where he was introduced to basketball by his high school teacher. He started to take the sport seriously when he was offered a scholarship to Illawarra Sports High School in Wollongong, and from there he earned a scholarship to Northern Oklahoma College in the United States. Atem was on the 2012–13 roster at North Oklahoma College, but he was forced to redshirt the season, which made him re-think his commitment and ultimately led to him deciding not to return to the program for the 2013–14 season.

Career in the Australian state leagues
Atem made his Australian state league debut in 2014, playing a handful of games for the Ipswich Force in the Queensland Basketball League (QBL). He spent the majority of the year with the Force's Southern Basketball League (SBL) affiliate team and was named the MVP of the SBL team.

For the 2014–15 NBL season, Atem was a member of the Adelaide 36ers' development program. He participated in the team's preseason exhibition matches. He remained in South Australia for the 2015 Premier League season, where he played for the Eastern Mavericks. He continued on with the 36ers for the 2015–16 NBL season as a member of the team's training squad.

In November 2015, Atem signed with the North-West Tasmania Thunder for the 2016 SEABL season. In 20 games for the Thunder, he averaged 2.5 points and 1.3 rebounds per game.

On 31 October 2016, Atem signed with the Goldfields Giants for the 2017 State Basketball League season. In 23 games for the Giants, he averaged 5.0 points and 4.1 rebounds per game.

In December 2017, Atem signed with the North Adelaide Rockets for the 2018 season, returning to the Premier League for a second stint. In 18 games, he averaged 13.2 points, 7.4 rebounds and 1.0 assists per game.

In March 2019, Atem signed with the Shepparton Gators of the Big V Division One. In 27 games, he averaged 19.37 points, 9.89 rebounds and 1.11 assists per game.

In 2020, Atem played for the South West Metro Pirates in the Queensland State League (QSL).

In March 2021, Atem signed with the Northside Wizards for the 2021 NBL1 North season. In 12 games, he averaged 13.33 points, 6.0 rebounds and 1.41 assists per game.

In April 2022, Atem re-signed with the Wizards for the 2022 season. In 15 games, he averaged 4.6 points and 2.5 rebounds per game.

National team
In March 2017, Atem played for the South Sudanese national team at the FIBA AfroBasket 2017 qualifiers. In four games, he averaged 9.8 points and 9.3 rebounds per game.

References

External links
NBL1 profile
"Up and Atem" at theadvocate.com.au

1991 births
Living people
Forwards (basketball)
South Sudanese emigrants to Australia
South Sudanese men's basketball players
South Sudanese refugees
Refugees in Kenya
Sportsmen from New South Wales
Australian men's basketball players
People from Jonglei State